The 2018 Hank Steinbrecher Cup was the sixth edition of the United States Adult Soccer Association's (USASA) tournament whose winner is recognized with the title of U.S. National Amateur Champions.

Premier Development League (PDL) side Michigan Bucks successfully defended their title.

Host selection
Veterans Memorial Stadium in New Britain, Connecticut was selected as the host venue for the tournament.

Teams

Qualification
The tournament featured the 2017 PDL champion Charlotte Eagles, the 2017 National Professional Soccer League (NPSL) champion Elm City Express, the 2017 USASA National Amateur Cup winner Lansdowne Bhoys FC and the defending Steinbrecher Cup winner Michigan Bucks.

Draw and schedule
The draw to determine semifinal matchups took place on March 23, 2018 at Toyota Park in Bridgeview, Illinois. The Lansdowne Bhoys FC drew the Charlotte Eagles in the first semifinal, and the Michigan Bucks were matched against the Elm City Express in the second semifinal. The semifinal matches were scheduled to take place on June 1, followed by the third-place and final matches on June 2.

Matches

Bracket

* = after extra time

Semifinals

Third-Place Match

Final

See also
2017 NPSL season
2017 PDL season

References

External links
 Official USASA website

2018